Lorna Nyarinda Nyabuto (born 13 October 2000) is a Kenyan professional footballer who plays as a midfielder for the Kenyan Women's Premier League club Vihiga Queens FC and the Kenya women's national team.

International career 
Nyarinda made her debut for Kenya in a 2022 African Cup of Nations qualifiers against South Sudan.

See also
List of Kenya women's international footballers

References

External links 

 
 

2000 births
Kenyan women's footballers
Kenya women's international footballers
Women's association football midfielders
Living people